Floria Sigismondi (born 1965) is an Italian-Canadian film director, screenwriter, music video director, artist, and photographer.

She is best known for writing and directing The Runaways, for directing music videos for performers including Dua Lipa, Sam Smith, Jimmy Page and Robert Plant (of Led Zeppelin fame), Marilyn Manson, Christina Aguilera, Justin Timberlake, Rihanna, Leonard Cohen, Katy Perry, Björk, and David Bowie, and commercials for brands such as Gucci, MAC, Target, and Nike. Sigismondi has also directed television including two episodes of The Handmaid's Tale and American Gods.

Life and career
Sigismondi was born in Pescara, Abruzzo, Italy. Her parents, Lina and Domenico Sigismondi, were opera singers. Her family, including her sister Antonella, moved to Hamilton, Ontario, Canada when she was two. In her childhood she became obsessed by drawing and painting. Starting in 1987, she studied painting and illustration at the Ontario College of Art, today's Ontario College of Art & Design University (OCADU). When she took a photography course, she became obsessed once more, and graduated with a photography major.

Sigismondi started a career as a fashion photographer. She came to directing music videos when she was approached by the production company The Revolver Film Co., and directed music videos for a number of Canadian bands. Her very innovative, but also very disturbing video works, located in sceneries she once described as "entropic underworlds inhabited by tortured souls and omnipotent beings," attracted a number of very prominent musicians. She has further described her works as, "Something quite textural and brutal" and something quite beautiful and light. It's like blending two worlds."

With her photography and sculpture installations she had solo exhibitions in Hamilton and Toronto, New York City, Brescia (Italy), Gothenburg (Sweden), and London. Her photographs also were included in numerous group exhibitions, together with artists such as Cindy Sherman, Joel-Peter Witkin, and Francesco Clemente. The German art press Die Gestalten Verlag has published two monographs of her photography, Redemption (1999) and Immune (2005). Sigismondi also willingly creates her own set props for various music video productions such as, Perfume Genius's "Die 4 U". "If I don't create them myself, I design or draw them, I can get quite tactile detailed as far as what I see." She has an affinity for strange yet alluring things and created a flesh-esque chair to appeal to the sexual tension and desire to the spectator.

Film director
Sigismondi's first feature-length film was The Runaways, a period piece about the 1970s all-girl rock and roll band The Runaways. The film is largely about the relationship between Joan Jett and Cherie Currie. Sigismondi wrote the screenplay based on Currie's book Neon Angel: A Memoir of a Runaway. The film premiered in 2010 at the Sundance Film Festival and was released in Canada and the United States in March 2010.

In 2020, Sigismondi directed the horror film The Turning, which was inspired by the 1898 Henry James novella The Turn of the Screw, and stars Mackenzie Davis and Finn Wolfhard.

Filmography
 Postmortem Bliss (short film, 2006)
 The Runaways (2010)
 Leaning Towards Solace (short film, 2012)
 Hemlock Grove (TV series, episode "Bodily Fluids", 2014)
 Daredevil (TV series, episode "Kinbaku", 2016)
 The Handmaid's Tale (TV series, 2 episodes 2017)
 American Gods (TV series, episode "Come to Jesus", 2017)
 The Turning  (2020)
 The Silence of Mercy (TBA)

Music videos (selection)

Director

Cinematographer

2000 "4 Ton Mantis", Amon Tobin

Awards (selection)
2013 MTV Music Video Award, USA - Winner for Video of The Year, for Mirrors (Justin Timberlake)
2004 Juno Awards, Canada - Best Music Video, for "Fighter" (Christina Aguilera)
2003 MTV European Awards - Best International Video Award, for Untitled (Sigur Rós)
2003 New York Underground Film Festival - Audio/Visual Award, for Untitled (Sigur Rós)
2003 Advertising and Design Awards, Toronto, Ontario, Canada - Special Merit Award for Music Video, for "Fighter" (Christina Aguilera)
1999 German Kodak Photobook Award, for her book Redemption
1998 British Music Video Awards, UK - Nomination for Best Video: "Little Wonder" (David Bowie)
1997 MTV Music Video Awards, USA - Nomination for Best Rock Video: "Beautiful People" (Marilyn Manson)

References

External links

Interview in Revolutionart International Magazine 4
The Raconteurs' video for 'Broken Boy Soldier' + interview with director Floria Sigismondi.
CoolHunting.com Video Interview
A Short Film directed by Floria also with a brief interview
Commercials, select music videos and a biography at Believe Media
Official site for the feature documentary 'FLicKeR'
Fright Club - The New York Times Magazine

1965 births
Canadian music video directors
Canadian photographers
Canadian women film directors
English-language film directors
Female music video directors
Italian emigrants to Canada
Italian women photographers
Living people
OCAD University alumni
People from Hamilton, Ontario
People from Pescara
Canadian women photographers
Juno Award for Video of the Year winners